"Lips Are Movin" is a song by American singer-songwriter Meghan Trainor, taken from her debut major-label studio album Title (2015). It was written by Trainor and the album's producer, Kevin Kadish. Epic Records premiered the song on MTV News on October 15, 2014, and released it to United States contemporary hit radio stations on October 21, as the second single from Title. A retro-tinged doo-wop and pop song with girl-group harmonies and bubblegum pop hooks, "Lips Are Movin" was inspired by Trainor's conflict with her record label. However, critical commentary has described it as a song about Trainor leaving her significant other after discovering he is cheating on her.

Critics drew similarities between the song's style and that of Trainor's debut single, "All About That Bass" (2014). Some deemed the song catchy, while others criticized its lyrics. In the United States, "Lips Are Movin" reached number four on the Billboard Hot 100 and was certified quadruple platinum by the Recording Industry Association of America (RIAA). It received platinum or multi-platinum certifications in Australia, Canada, New Zealand, and the United Kingdom, and reached the top 10 on their charts among others.

Philip Andelman directed the music video for "Lips Are Movin", which was commissioned by technology corporate Hewlett-Packard. The first-ever music video created entirely by social media influencers, it portrays behind-the-scenes events of a video shoot. Trainor performed "Lips Are Movin" on televised shows such as Today, The Voice, and Dancing with the Stars, and included it on the set lists for three of her concert tours: 2015's That Bass Tour and MTrain Tour and 2016's the Untouchable Tour.

Background

American songwriter Kevin Kadish met Meghan Trainor in June 2013 at the request of Carla Wallace, the co-owner of Trainor's publishing firm Big Yellow Dog Music. Kadish liked Trainor's voice and booked a writing session with her. They subsequently co-wrote the song "All About That Bass" in November 2013 and pitched it to different record labels, all of which turned it down due to its doo-wop pop production as synth-pop was more popular at the time. L.A. Reid, the chairman of Epic Records, heard it and encouraged Trainor to record it herself. She signed with the label in 2014 and released it as her debut single in June that year. The song reached numberone in 58 countries and sold 11 million units worldwide.

Following the success of "All About That Bass", Trainor's A&R suggested that she and Kadish write more songs together. Kadish produced eight tracks for her debut major-label studio album Title (2015), and co-wrote seven of them, including "Lips Are Movin". Following the album's initial completion, the two had an additional day to work together and went into the studio. Trainor overheard the instrumental track for "Lips Are Movin" through Kadish's headphone box and insisted they write it that day. Trainor started singing the song's verse after Kadish came up with the line "I know you're lying, your lips are moving", and they finished writing it within eight minutes. In a 2014 interview, he spoke fondly about writing with Trainor: "It's almost like we share a brain musically when we're writing a song. I've never had that with anyone before."

Composition and lyrics

"Lips Are Movin" is 3:01 in length. Kadish produced, engineered, and mixed the song at the Carriage House studio in Nolensville, Tennessee. He plays the acoustic bass, baritone saxophone, drums, guitar, and piano, and David Baron plays the organ. The track was mastered by Dave Kutch at the Mastering Palace in New York.

Trainor told The Tennessean that the musical composition of "Lips Are Movin" and "All About That Bass" follows the same formula, which Slant Magazines Alexa Camp described as "doo-wop throwback, girl-group harmonies and bubblegum pop hooks". "Lips Are Movin" is a retro-tinged doo-wop and pop song, with production that makes use of handclaps, and a post-chorus chant reminiscent of the latter. The lyrics, too, reference it with the line, "I gave you bass/You gave me sweet talk." Trainor assumes a Southern-inflected patois while singing over the song's saxophone bleats. AllMusic's Stephen Thomas Erlewine described it as Motown bounce.

Kadish stated that the lyrics of "Lips Are Movin" were inspired by Trainor's frustrations with her record label. However, reviewers, including The Tennesseans Dave Paulson and MTV News' Christina Garibaldi, deemed it a track about leaving a significant other after being cheated on, an interpretation Kadish is open to.

Release
MTV News reported the song "Title" (2014) would be released as Trainor's second single, in September 2014. Kadish went to New York to meet with Reid and voiced his regret about not having "Lips Are Movin" ready in time for the release of Trainor's debut extended play Title that month, and its potential release as the follow-up single. Reid announced at the meeting that he was going with it as the second single and scrapping "Title", and was quoted by Kadish as saying, "I think this song will do better."

On October 14, 2014, "Lips Are Movin" was briefly available to stream on mobile application Shazam, and premiered along with its artwork on MTV News the following day. Epic Records released the song to contemporary hit radio in the United States on October 21, and for digital download in various countries. British radio station BBC Radio 1 added it to rotation on December 26, 2014, and the record label sent it to radio stations in Italy on January 16, 2015. In the UK, "Lips Are Movin" was made available to those who pre-ordered Title, with its digital release as a single being held back until January 18. Sony Music released a CD single exclusively for sale by United States retailer Best Buy on December 30, 2014, and in Germany on February 13, 2015.

Critical reception

"Lips Are Movin" received widespread comparisons to "All About That Bass" from music critics. Mikael Wood of the Los Angeles Times considered it one of Titles dozen versions of the latter, which he found as cheerful but also as annoying. Writing for Clash, Alice Levine remarked that the songs have the same "factory-produced sass" and theme of false feminism and empowerment, but being done a second time decreased its novelty. The Boston Globes Marc Hirsh derided "Lips Are Movin" for following the formula of "All About That Bass", writing that Trainor is a plunderer and "steals from herself" with the song. Spins Dan Weiss criticized the lyrics and compared them to the age-old joke about lawyers being liars. Toronto Stars Ben Rayner wrote that it is "whitewashed into a fairly anodyne mush", and declared that its "hip-hop bump and plush bassline" are "pure cosmetic window dressing". He considered them an attempt to make Trainor's "old-timey aesthetic" feel contemporary.

Other reviewers were positive of "Lips Are Movin". Billboards Carl Wilson complimented the lyrics, saying that they proved Trainor had "more going on than a topical trifle", but concluded that the song was risking "coming off as 'Bass, Part 2". Brian Mansfield of USA Today called "Lips Are Movin" the "better record" of the two. Garibaldi described it as an up-beat and catchy "ladies anthem", and a Billboard critic stated that the "upbeat and sassy" song's similarities with "All About That Bass" would lead to "great things" for it. In a favorable review, Andrew Hampp from the same magazine said that "Lips Are Movin" helped solidify Trainor "as the self-proclaimed queen of her own genre, 'she-wop". Erlewine declared it the best song on the album and wrote that it would help the listener accept Trainor's "pastiche and performance" skills, and Chicago Tribunes Matt Pais considered it a showcase of Trainor's "versatility, confidence, vulnerability and smartness".

Chart performance

"Lips Are Movin" debuted at number 93 on the US Billboard Hot 100 issued for November 8, 2014. On December 10, 2014, the song moved from number 13 to number eight and became Trainor's second consecutive top-10 entry, selling 110,000 digital downloads and earning 7.8 million streams. It peaked at number four in its eighth week on the chart, receiving 116,000 sales and 8 million streams during the tracking week. This made Trainor the fifth female artist in Billboard Hot 100 chart history to follow her debut number-one single directly with a second top-five. The Recording Industry Association of America (RIAA) certified the single 4× Platinum, which denotes four million units based on sales and track-equivalent on-demand streams. On the Canadian Hot 100, "Lips Are Movin" peaked at number seven and was certified 2× Platinum by Music Canada.

The song debuted at number 89 on the UK Singles Chart issued for December 21, 2014. Following its digital release as a single in the United Kingdom, it rose from number 50 to its peak of number two on January 25, 2015. The British Phonographic Industry (BPI) certified "Lips Are Movin" Platinum. In Germany, the song reached number 10 and was certified Gold. It peaked at number three in Australia and was certified 4× Platinum. In New Zealand, the track peaked at number five and was certified Platinum. Elsewhere, "Lips Are Movin" charted within the top 10 of national record charts, at number two in Scotland, Venezuela, number three in Czech Republic, Poland, number four in Slovakia, number five in Ireland, Slovenia, Spain, number six in Austria, and number 10 in the Netherlands, South Africa. The song additionally made the top 30, at number 18 in Hungary, Switzerland, number 22 in Norway, number 23 in Denmark, and number 28 in Sweden. It received a Double Platinum certification in Sweden, Platinum in Mexico, Spain and Gold in Denmark and Italy.

Music video

Background and concept
Philip Andelman directed the music video for "Lips Are Movin", which was filmed in Los Angeles, California. It premiered on Trainor's Vevo account on November 19, 2014. Information technology corporation Hewlett-Packard (HP) commissioned the video, which features appearances by social media influencers—actors, dancers and set designers with large social media followings. It is the first-ever music video to be created solely by Vine, Instagram and YouTube stars.

Trainor wanted to create something as "big and fun" as the music video for "All About That Bass", and did not want the video to just feature her yelling at a male love interest. Hewlett-Packard and ad agency 180LA had been contacting record labels, wanting to help create a music video as part of the promotional campaign for the former's newly launched Pavilion x360 laptop, when they thought of Trainor. A creative director for 180LA told Adweek that they picked Trainor as her music would suit a "fun, high-energy campaign" and she had the potential to inspire the influencers' followers. HP and Trainor picked out the influencers, which include American YouTuber Liza Koshy, French dancers Les Twins, and American dancer Chachi Gonzales. Trainor described the concept of the video in an interview with MTV News: "Here's me being sassy and other people dancing with me and having just a good time and trying to get through this feeling of, Ugh he's cheating on me again". She said she was excited about it and concluded "it still feels very 'Meghan Trainor,' which is amazing!".

The video depicts behind-the-scenes events of a music video shoot. The x360 laptop appears frequently in the music video as a product placement, beginning with its use as a digital clapperboard in the opening scene.

Synopsis

In the music video, Trainor, in a black leather jacket, sings in front of a pastel blue backdrop. She performs choreography with the influencers in subsequent scenes, on vibrant studio sets of bright colors. The meta concept of the visuals also depicts Trainor getting her makeup done and choosing wardrobe. Lips are used as a motif throughout the video; they appear as close-ups of Trainor's mouth, lip-shaped earrings and sunglasses, and as a large drawing in the backdrop, the latter of which Yahoo! Music writer Lyndsey Parker compared to those in a poster for The Rocky Horror Picture Show. Trainor is later seen lying on a lip-shaped sofa. One of Trainor's outfits include a bubblegum-colored dress with two cat faces on it, which Mike Pell of MTV UK compared to the top Katy Perry wore at the 2014 MTV Europe Music Awards.

Reception
The music video's release reportedly boosted Trainor's social media presence, including an 11% surge in Twitter followers, 16% on Facebook, 41.3% on Instagram, and an almost 100% increase on Vine. Hampp said that in being the first-ever music video created entirely by social media influencers, its production was a "historic milestone in the realm of YouTube creators". James Cowan of Canadian Business believed that some could see Hewlett-Packard's involvement as a dull brand trying to appear modish by attaching itself to influencers, but a more enthusiastic viewer may call it "arts patronage for the 21st century", and noted that the sponsorship is so limited that no one would notice it without searching.

Pell called it a thematic continuation of the "All About That Bass" video, due to the bright and ebullient sets featured in both clips. Fuse's Hilary Hughes wrote that the "Lips Are Movin" music video offered a bolder look for Trainor, which constituted a style shift from the latter and "definitely made a statement", but retained its "cheekiness and big-eyed adorable vibes". Parker wrote that Trainor's cat outfit was a "fashion statement" that was bound to get attention, and remarked that the excessive use of lips as a motif could be seen as Trainor's informal campaign for a M.A.C. Viva Glam endorsement deal.

Live performances

Trainor performed "Lips Are Movin" live on NBC's Today on November 5, 2014, where she gave an interview and received a plaque. On November 27, she performed the song at the Macy's Thanksgiving Day Parade on a GoldieBlox float. Trainor performed it on the finale of The Voices seventh season on December 16. She performed a medley of "Lips Are Movin" and "All About That Bass" on the season 19 finale of America's Dancing with the Stars. Trainor performed an acoustic version of the former song on The Tonight Show Starring Jimmy Fallon on January 15, 2015, during which she played the guitar. She performed it during Todays 2015 Toyota Concert Series as well as their 2016 Citi Concert Series.

A live rendition of "Lips Are Movin" appeared on BBC Radio 1's Live Lounge 2015. Trainor included the song in her set list for the Jingle Ball Tour 2014, the 2015 Summertime Ball, her That Bass and MTrain Tours, and The Untouchable Tour (2016). She performed it while headlining the Philadelphia Welcome America Festival as part of the 2019 Fourth of July celebrations.

Credits and personnel
Credits adapted from the liner notes of Title
Location
Recorded, engineered, and mixed at The Carriage House, Nolensville, Tennessee
Mastered at The Mastering Palace (New York)

Personnel
Kevin Kadishproducer, songwriter, engineer, acoustic bass, baritone saxophone, drums, guitar, mixing, piano
Meghan Trainorsongwriter
David Baronorgan
Dave Kutchmastering

Charts

Weekly charts

Year-end charts

Certifications

Release history

See also
 List of Billboard Hot 100 top 10 singles in 2014

Footnotes

References

2014 singles
2014 songs
Bubblegum pop songs
Doo-wop songs
Epic Records singles
Meghan Trainor songs
Songs written by Kevin Kadish
Songs written by Meghan Trainor